HMS Panther was a 50-gun fourth rate ship of the line of the Royal Navy, built at Deptford Dockyard and launched on 15 March 1703.

In 1707, she belonged to Admiral Sir Cloudesley Shovell's fleet. She saw action during the unsuccessful Battle of Toulon and was present during the great naval disaster off the Isles of Scilly when Shovell and four of his ships (Association, Firebrand, Romney and Eagle) were lost, claiming the lives of nearly 2,000 sailors. Panther suffered little to no damage and finally managed to reach Portsmouth.

Panther was rebuilt according to the 1706 Establishment at Woolwich Dockyard, and relaunched on 6 April 1716. She was hulked in 1743, remaining in that role until she was sold out of the navy in 1768.

Notes

References

Lavery, Brian (2003) The Ship of the Line - Volume 1: The development of the battlefleet 1650-1850. Conway Maritime Press. .

Ships of the line of the Royal Navy
1700s ships